Thomas Grahame (March 20, 1840 – May 7, 1907) was an Ontario political figure. He represented York West in the Legislative Assembly of Ontario as a Conservative member from 1867 to 1871.

He was born in Vaughan Township, Upper Canada in 1840 and educated at Upper Canada College, the University of Toronto and the University of Glasgow, the son of a Scottish immigrant who later returned to Scotland.

He died in London in 1907.

References

External links

The Canadian parliamentary companion and annual register, 1869, HJ Morgan

1840 births
1907 deaths
Progressive Conservative Party of Ontario MPPs
Canadian people of Scottish descent